The Istanbul mayoral election, 2009 for the office of mayor of the Istanbul Metropolitan Municipality (Turkish: İstanbul Büyükşehir Belediye Başkanlığı) was held on 29 March 2009 and was won by the Justice and Development Party candidate, the incumbent Kadir Topbaş.

The closely fought contest was noticeable in that it helped launch the national political career of Kemal Kılıçdaroğlu, who would go on to assume the leadership of his party.

Results

References 

2009 elections in Turkey
Elections in Istanbul
2000s in Istanbul
March 2009 events in Turkey